The sibilant sirystes (Sirystes sibilator) is a species of bird in the family Tyrannidae. It was formerly considered conspecific with the western sirystes, the white-rumped sirystes, and Todd's sirystes.

Distribution and habitat
It is found from northwestern Brazil to northeastern Argentina. Its natural habitat is subtropical or tropical moist lowland forests.

References

sibilant sirystes
Birds of Brazil
Birds of Paraguay
sibilant sirystes
Taxa named by Louis Jean Pierre Vieillot
Taxonomy articles created by Polbot